Autauga Academy is a private coed PK-12 school in Prattville, Alabama, the seat of Autauga County.

History

Autauga Private Academy was founded in 1969 as a segregation academy.  It is distinct from a seminary of the same name founded in 1888.

Autauga attracted the attention of the United States Commission on Civil Rights, prompting an inspection tour in 1982, along with eight other schools in Alabama

In 2011, a black student, O. J. Howard, was told by the headmaster of the school he could not bring a girl to the prom because she was white.

Since then, the headmaster of 2011 has been fired and replaced with a new one.

Notable alumni 
 Will Dismukes, Republican Alabama state politician. Dismukes is an outspoken Autauga alum and known for his support of the KKK. Dismukes was arrested on 8/6 on suspicion of felony theft .
 O. J. Howard, NFL player for the Tampa Bay Buccaneers

References 

Private K-12 schools in Alabama
Educational institutions established in 1969
Segregation academies in Alabama
1969 establishments in Alabama
Schools in Autauga County, Alabama